Ralph Hill (8 October 1900 - 19 October 1950) was an English writer on music. Hill was born in Watford into a musical family: one of his grandfathers was Joseph Williams the music publisher; the other was Thomas Henry Weist Hill, violinist, conductor and the first director of the Guildhall School of Music. After attending Latymer Upper School Hill was taught cello by his father at Guildhall. By 1920, following military service for two years, he was active in music publishing, influenced by the example of Ernest Newman.

His first full-time appointment was as editor of the Musical Mirror and Fanfare from 1929 to
1932. The following year he became music editor of the Radio Times, a post he held until 1945. He was also  assistant music critic with the Daily Mail from 1933, and was later (1945–48) appointed chief music critic on the paper, succeeding Edwin Evans. Hill was editor of The Liverpool Daily Post and (for two years) The Sunday Express, and from the 1940s a regular BBC broadcaster on classical music. In 1946 he was appointed editor of The Penguin Music Magazine (nine issues, 1946-1949) and the Pelican annual book series Music (1950 and 1951).

Hill, who lived at 39 Hazlewell Rd in Putney, founded the Putney Gramophone Society in the autumn of 1949. He was also a wrestling enthusiast, and arranged several friendly matches with the pianist Benno Moiseiwitsch, who was also a skilled wrestler. Hill died at his home on October 19, 1950, having been taken ill after attending the Royal Philharmonic Society concert at the Albert Hall the previous evening.

Publications
 An Outline of Musical History (1929)
 Brahms: A Study in Musical Biography (1933)
 Liszt ('Great Lives' series) (1936; 2nd ed., 1949)
 Brahms ('Great Lives' series) (1941)
 Challenges: A Series of Controversial Essays on Music (1943)
 'Some Reflections on Music Criticism' in Musical Quarterly, April 1943, pp. 188–197
 Music without Fears (1945)
 The Symphony (ed.) (1949)
 Music 1950
 Music 1951
 Prelude to Music (1951)
 The Concerto (ed.) (1952)

References

British music critics
English music critics
Classical music critics
Opera critics
1900 births
1950 deaths
Alumni of the Guildhall School of Music and Drama
People from Putney